The 2018–19 Binghamton Bearcats women's basketball team represented Binghamton University during the 2018–19 NCAA Division I women's basketball season. The Bearcats, led by first year head coach Bethann Ord, played their home games at Binghamton University Events Center as members of the America East Conference.

Media
All home games and conference road games will stream on either ESPN3 or AmericaEast.tv. Most road games will stream on the opponents website. All games will be broadcast on the radio on WNBF and streamed online.

Roster

Schedule

|-
!colspan=9 style=| Exhibition

|-
!colspan=9 style=| Non-conference regular season

|-
!colspan=9 style=| America East regular season

|-
!colspan=9 style=| America East Women's Tournament

See also
2018–19 Binghamton Bearcats men's basketball team

References

Binghamton Bearcats women's basketball seasons
Binghamton
Binghamton Bearcats women's basketball
Binghamton Bearcats women's basketball